"In My Bed" is a song by American singer Sabrina Carpenter from her fourth studio album Singular: Act II (2019), serving as the opening track of the album. Carpenter wrote the song alongside Steph Jones and the song's producer Mike Sabath. Hollywood Records released the song as the third and final single from the album on June 7, 2019, along with the pre-order of the album.

Background 
Carpenter announced the song's release along with Singular: Act II's tracklist revelation. When asked about the song, Carpenter said "It's a clever play on words instead of saying, ‘I'm in my head about it’. The song is about one of those moments where life feels like a lot to deal with. We took that and turned it into something really fun and vulnerable."

The song was written in 2019 by Carpenter, Mike Sabath and Steph Jones. It was produced and mixed by Sabath and the vocals were produced by Sabath and Jones. The song was mastered at Sterling Sound in New York City by Chris Gehringer with Will Quinnell serving as an assistant.

Composition 
"In My Bed" is an upbeat electropop song with dance-pop influences. It has a chorus with a synth-pop inspired rhythm. Lyrically the song is about coping when life is a lot to deal with.

Music video

Background and release 
A visualizer video for the song accompanied the song's release. It show footage of Carpenter's photoshoot for the song's promotional photos. Carpenter confirmed that there will be an official music video for the song via Instagram live on June 6, 2019. Carpenter formally announced the video via social media by posting an ASMR video that was filmed while she filmed the music video. At the end of the video Carpenter says "I would like to request a song: "In My Bed" by Sabrina Carpenter" and commented saying "shhhh... #inmybed music video tomorrow".

The song's official music video premiered via Marie Claire Magazine on June 28, 2019. Later that day it was posted onto Carpenter's Vevo and YouTube channels. The video was directed by Phillip R. Lopez and filmed in Toronto, Canada, before Carpenter began filming her upcoming movie Work It.

Synopsis 

The video begins with Carpenter sleeping on a bed. She then wakes up and begins levitating over the bed. She is then seen in another bed that is in a very messy room. The same room which the ASMR video was shot. In the messy room she is seen brushing her hair, walking around, dancing and fidgeting with several items in the room including a lava lamp and stuffed animals. Then as the chorus starts Carpenter is seen with googly and hypnosis eyes. Carpenter is then seen in a green suit laying on a floor in three spots individually. She is then seen in all three places at the same time where there are three of her. After that, Carpenter is in the same green suit where four of her are on a couch. The camera then moves out of the couch scene to the messy room in the form of the couch scene looking like a picture. Carpenter is then once again seen with her hypnosis eyes. The camera zooms in on her hypnosis eyes and a bunch of Carpenter's head are seen swirling around. The next scene Carpenter is seen wearing a white straitjacket in a room with a bunch of black and white photos of her in the past. Carpenter is then seen in that same room where a bunch of doctors are evaluating her. She is later seen dancing with them. The camera then goes into a picture in the back of the room that shows the room at a different time. That is done a number of times. The video ends with Carpenter going back on the bed she was levitating above at the beginning.

Critical reception 
Rania Aniftos of Billboard described it as "colourful" and that "the viewer is transported into a hypnotic world."

Live performances 
Carpenter debuted the song on Good Morning America's Summer Concert Series.

Credits and personnel
Recording and management
Mastered at Sterling Sound (New York City)
Seven Summits Music (BMI) obo Itself and Pink Mic Music (BMI), Vistaville Music (ASCAP) obo Itself, Steph Jones Who Music (ASCAP) and Big Deal Hits (ASCAP), Sony/ATV Ballad/Mike Sabath Songs (BMI)

Personnel

Sabrina Carpenter – lead vocals, songwriting
Steph Jones – songwriting, vocal production
Mike Sabath – songwriting, production, mixing, vocal production
Chris Gehringer – mastering
Will Quinnell  – assistant

Credits adapted from Singular: Act II liner notes.

Release history

References 

Sabrina Carpenter songs
2019 songs
Songs written by Sabrina Carpenter
Songs written by Steph Jones
Songs written by Mike Sabath